Dominik Braunsteiner (born 15 July 1992) is an Austrian football player.

Club career
He made his Austrian Football First League debut for First Vienna FC on 22 May 2013 in a game against SV Horn.

Ahead of the 2019-20 season, Braunsteiner joined RSV Marianum Post 17.

References

External links
 
 Dominik Braunsteiner at ÖFB

1992 births
Footballers from Vienna
Living people
Austrian footballers
First Vienna FC players
SC Wiener Neustadt players
2. Liga (Austria) players
Austrian Regionalliga players
Association football goalkeepers